St Martha's Hill and Colyer's Hanger is a   nature reserve north of Chilworth in Surrey. It is owned by the Albury Estate  and managed by Surrey County Council. Colyers Hanger is a Site of Special Scientific Interest and a Nature Conservation Review site, Grade 2. Earth circles, which are probably associated with tree planting for Chilworth Manor, are a Scheduled Monument.

There is a church on the top of St Martha's Hill, which has views of eight counties on a clear day. The site is woodland and calcareous grassland, which has a rare mixture of chalk grassland flora.

There is access from Guildford Lane and Halfpenny Lane.

References

Nature reserves in Surrey